The Patinoire Iceberg (also called l'Iceberg; in English: Iceberg ice rink) is an ice hockey rink located in Strasbourg, France. The Ligue Magnus ice hockey team,  the Étoile Noire de Strasbourg play their home games here.

Description 
The iceberg was opened in December 2005, and has two rinks. The competition rink features 1,200 seats, which can be expanded to 2,400 seats for some events.

External links 
 {fr} Official Site

Indoor ice hockey venues in France
Sports venues in Strasbourg
Buildings and structures in Strasbourg
Sports venues completed in 2005
21st-century architecture in France